Ryan Confidential is an Irish home-produced television programme which was broadcast on RTÉ One until 2010. It was presented by Gerry Ryan, until his unexpected death at the age of 53 on 30 April 2010. The programme was created by the producer David Blake Knox.

The format placed Ryan and celebrity guests in restaurants and hotels, designed to provide a more intimate setting than a studio. Ryan then interviewed his guests. The programme, commissioned by RTÉ's Entertainment Department, proved popular, and ran for eight seasons.

History
Guests on Ryan Confidential included Ben Dunne who spoke of feeling like a "bloody eejit" for provoking the set up of the Tribunals, Colin Farrell whose use of "salty language" prompted a large number of complaints despite an on-screen warning about the show's content  and Brian O'Driscoll who appeared replete with "interesting haircut" before an important Celtic League match for Leinster. The Irish Times critic, Shane Hegarty, said of an early interview with multimillionaire step dancer Michael Flatley: ``Gerry Ryan returned to the television screens again this week. He has a habit of doing that, like a fly you thought you'd chased from the room.``  Ryan alluded to the upset this remark caused him in a special Ryan Tubridy Confidential, aired on 16 October 2008 to coincide with the release of the presenter's autobiography, in which the tables were turned on the regular interviewer as he was asked questions by his protégé Ryan Tubridy. Tubridy was selected after RTÉ expressed their dissatisfaction at Ryan's original plan - to interview himself.

The eighth and final series featured interviews with Conan O'Brien, Roger Moore and, Hugh Hefner at the Playboy Mansion. The Hefner and O'Brien interviews were recorded in Los Angeles. In a rare interview O'Brien said he was more comfortable with Ireland than the pressures of American television.

Ryan's interview with Heather Mills from the eighth series was first broadcast the night before his death. A re-edited and extended version of the 2008 episode, in which Ryan was interviewed by Ryan Tubridy, was aired after the presenter's death. It drew an audience share of 40.5 per cent, and 565,000 viewers - the highest ratings for any episode of Ryan Confidential. The final Ryan Confidential filmed before the presenter's death, the George Hook episode, aired on 20 May 2010. It was viewed by more than 400,000 viewers. Hook later described Gerry Ryan as "a superb interviewer".

Guest list
This is an incomplete and incomprehensive list of guests who have featured on Ryan Confidential.

Specials
A Ryan Confidential Special, in tribute to Joe Dolan, a past guest on the show who had died, was screened on RTÉ One on 24 March 2008 at 18:30.

Ronnie Drew: A Ryan Confidential Special aired on 1 January 2009 on RTÉ One at 18:30.

References

External links
 Official site
 Transcript of interview
 

2004 Irish television series debuts
2010 Irish television series endings
Irish television talk shows
RTÉ original programming